The 1910 United States House of Representatives elections were held for the most part on November 8, 1910, while Maine and Vermont held theirs early in September, in the middle of President William Howard Taft's term. Elections were held for all 391 seats of the United States House of Representatives, representing 46 states, to the 62nd United States Congress.

The conservative Taft contended with major factional splits within his Republican Party. Instead of using his position as president to bridge compromise, Taft alienated the progressive wing of the party, which had championed his predecessor, Theodore Roosevelt. While conservatives controlled the largest number of elected positions for Republicans, progressive politics had been what brought many voters to the polls. The clash of these units of the Republican Party, combined with the message of unity from the Democratic Party, was enough to allow the Democrats to take control of the House, ending 16 years in opposition. This was the first time that the Socialist Party won a seat.

Issues 
Protection was the ideological cement holding the Republican coalition together. High tariffs were used by Republicans to promise higher sales to business, higher wages to industrial workers, and higher demand for their crops to farmers.  Progressive insurgents said it promoted monopoly. Democrats said it was a tax on the little man. It had greatest support in the Northeast, and greatest opposition in the South and West. The Midwest was the battleground.  The great battle over the high Payne–Aldrich Tariff Act in 1910 ripped the Republicans apart and set up the realignment in favor of the Democrats.

Election summaries

Election dates
In 1910, two states, with 6 seats between them, held elections early:

 September 6, Vermont
 September 12, Maine

Two newly admitted states held elections late: New Mexico and Arizona held their first elections in 1911.

Special elections 

|-
! 

|-
! 

|-
! 
| Samuel Louis Gilmore
|  | Democratic
| 1909  
|  | Incumbent died July 18, 1910.New member elected November 8, 1910.Democratic hold.Winner also elected to the next term, see below.
| nowrap | 

|-
! 
| Charles Q. Tirrell
|  | Republican
| 1900
|  | Incumbent died July 31, 1910.New member elected November 8, 1910.Democratic gain.Winner lost election to the next term, see below.
| nowrap | 

|-
! 

|-
! 
| Walter P. Brownlow
|  | Republican
| 1896
|  | Incumbent died July 8, 1910.New member elected November 8, 1910.Republican hold.
| nowrap | 

|-
! 

|}

Alabama

Arkansas

California

Colorado

Connecticut

Delaware

Florida

Georgia

Idaho 

|-
! 
| Thomas R. Hamer
|  | Republican
| 1908
|  | Incumbent lost renomination.New member elected.Republican hold.
| nowrap | 

|}

Illinois

Indiana

Iowa

Kansas

Kentucky

Louisiana

Maine

Maryland

Massachusetts 

|-
! 
| George P. Lawrence
|  | Republican
| 1897 (special)
| Incumbent re-elected.
| nowrap | 

|-
! 
| Frederick H. Gillett
|  | Republican
| 1892
| Incumbent re-elected.
| nowrap | 

|-
! 
| Charles G. Washburn
|  | Republican
| 1906 (special)
|  | Incumbent lost re-election.New member elected.Democratic gain.
| nowrap | 

|-
! 
| colspan="3" | Vacant
|  | Incumbent died July 31, 1910.New member elected.Republican hold.
| nowrap | 

|-
! 
| Butler Ames
|  | Republican
| 1902
| Incumbent re-elected.
| nowrap | 

|-
! 
| Augustus Peabody Gardner
|  | Republican
| 1902 (special)
| Incumbent re-elected.
| nowrap | 

|-
! 
| Ernest W. Roberts
|  | Republican
| 1898
| Incumbent re-elected.
| nowrap | 

|-
! 
| Samuel W. McCall
|  | Republican
| 1892
| Incumbent re-elected.
| nowrap | 

|-
! 
| John A. Keliher
|  | Democratic
| 1902
|  | Incumbent lost re-nomination.New member elected.Democratic hold.
| nowrap | 

|-
! 
| Joseph F. O'Connell
|  | Democratic
| 1906
|  | Incumbent lost re-nomination.New member elected.Democratic hold.
| nowrap | 

|-
! 
| Andrew James Peters
|  | Democratic
| 1906
| Incumbent re-elected.
| nowrap |  

|-
! 
| John W. Weeks
|  | Republican
| 1904
| Incumbent re-elected.
| nowrap |

|-
! 
| William S. Greene
|  | Republican
| 1898 (special)
| Incumbent re-elected.
| nowrap | 

|-
! 
| Eugene Foss
|  | Democratic
| 1910 (special)
|  | Incumbent retired to run for Governor of Massachusetts.New member elected.Republican gain.
| nowrap | 

|}

Michigan

Minnesota

Mississippi 

|-
! 
| Ezekiel S. Candler Jr.
|  | Democratic
| 1900
| Incumbent re-elected.
| nowrap | 

|-
! 
| Thomas Spight
|  | Democratic
| 1898 (special)
|  | Incumbent lost renomination.New member elected.Democratic hold.
| nowrap | 

|-
! 
| Benjamin G. Humphreys II
|  | Democratic
| 1902
| Incumbent re-elected.
| nowrap | 

|-
! 
| Thomas U. Sisson
|  | Democratic
| 1908
| Incumbent re-elected.
| nowrap | 

|-
! 
| Adam M. Byrd
|  | Democratic
| 1902
|  | Incumbent lost renomination.New member elected.Democratic hold.
| nowrap | 

|-
! 
| Eaton J. Bowers
|  | Democratic
| 1902
|  | Incumbent retired.New member elected.Democratic hold.
| nowrap | 

|-
! 
| William A. Dickson
|  | Democratic
| 1908
| Incumbent re-elected.
|  nowrap | 

|-
! 
| James Collier
|  | Democratic
| 1908
| Incumbent re-elected.
| nowrap | 

|}

Missouri

Montana 

|-
! 
| Charles N. Pray
|  | Republican
| 1906
| Incumbent re-elected.
| nowrap | 

|}

Nebraska 

|-
! 
| John A. Maguire
|  | Democratic
| 1908
| Incumbent re-elected.
| nowrap | 

|-
! 
| Gilbert Hitchcock
|  | Democratic
| 1906
|  | Incumbent retired to run for U.S. senator.New member elected.Democratic hold.
| nowrap | 

|-
! 
| James P. Latta
|  | Democratic
| 1908
| Incumbent re-elected.
| nowrap | 

|-
! 
| Edmund H. Hinshaw
|  | Republican
| 1902
|  | Incumbent retired.New member elected.Republican hold.
| nowrap | 

|-
! 
| George W. Norris
|  | Republican
| 1902
| Incumbent re-elected.
| nowrap | 

|-
! 
| Moses Kinkaid
|  | Republican
| 1902
| Incumbent re-elected.
| nowrap | 

|}

Nevada

New Hampshire

New Jersey

New York

North Carolina

North Dakota 

|-
! rowspan=2 | 
| Louis B. Hanna
|  | Republican
| nowrap | 1908
| Incumbent re-elected.
| nowrap rowspan=2 | 

|-
| Asle Gronna
|  | Republican
| nowrap | 1904
|  | Incumbent retired to run for U.S. senator.New member elected.Republican hold.

|}

Ohio

Oklahoma 

|-
! 
| Bird S. McGuire
| 
| 1907
| Incumbent re-elected.
| nowrap | 

|-
! 
| Dick T. Morgan
| 
| 1908
| Incumbent re-elected.
| nowrap | 

|-
! 
| Charles E. Creager
| 
| 1908
|  | Incumbent lost re-election.New member elected.Democratic gain.
| nowrap | 

|-
! 
| Charles D. Carter
| 
| 1907
| Incumbent re-elected.
| nowrap | 

|-
! 
| Scott Ferris
| 
| 1907
| Incumbent re-elected.
| nowrap | 

|}

Oregon 

|-
! 
| Willis C. Hawley
|  | Republican
| 1906
| Incumbent re-elected.
| nowrap | 
|-
! 
| William R. Ellis
|  | Republican
| 1906
|  | Incumbent lost renomination.New member elected.Republican hold.
| nowrap | 
|}

Pennsylvania

Rhode Island

South Carolina

South Dakota 

|-
! rowspan=2 | 
| Charles H. Burke
|  | Republican
| 1908
| Incumbent re-elected.
| rowspan=2 nowrap | 

|-
| Eben Martin
|  | Republican
| 1908
| Incumbent re-elected.

|}

Tennessee 

|-
! 
| Zachary D. Massey
|  | Republican
| 1910 (special)
|  |Incumbent retired.New member elected.Republican hold.
| nowrap | 

|-
! 
| Richard W. Austin
|  | Republican
| 1908
| Incumbent re-elected.
| nowrap | 

|-
! 
| John A. Moon
|  | Democratic
| 1896
| Incumbent re-elected.
| nowrap | 

|-
! 
| Cordell Hull
|  | Democratic
| 1906
| Incumbent re-elected.
|  nowrap | 

|-
! 
| William C. Houston
|  | Democratic
| 1904
| Incumbent re-elected.
| nowrap | 

|-
! 
| Jo Byrns
|  | Democratic
| 1908
| Incumbent re-elected.
| nowrap | 

|-
! 
| Lemuel P. Padgett
|  | Democratic
| 1900
| Incumbent re-elected.
| nowrap | 

|-
! 
| Thetus W. Sims
|  | Democratic
| 1896
| Incumbent re-elected.
| nowrap | 

|-
! 
| Finis J. Garrett
|  | Democratic
| 1904
| Incumbent re-elected.
| nowrap | 

|-
! 
| George Gordon
|  | Democratic
| 1906
| Incumbent re-elected.
| 

|}

Texas

Utah

Vermont

Virginia

Washington

West Virginia 

|-
! 
| William P. Hubbard
|  | Republican
| 1906
|  | Incumbent retired.New member elected.Democratic gain.
| nowrap | 

|-
! 
| George C. Sturgiss
|  | Republican
| 1906
|  | Incumbent lost re-election.New member elected.Democratic gain.
| nowrap | 

|-
! 
| Joseph H. Gaines
|  | Republican
| 1900
|  | Incumbent lost re-election.New member elected.Democratic gain.
| nowrap | 

|-
! 
| Harry C. Woodyard
|  | Republican
| 1902
|  | Incumbent lost re-election.New member elected.Democratic gain.
| nowrap | 

|-
! 
| James A. Hughes
|  | Republican
| 1900
| Incumbent re-elected.
| nowrap | 

|}

Wisconsin

Wyoming 

|-
! 
| Frank W. Mondell
|  | Republican
| 1898
| Incumbent re-elected.
| nowrap | 

|}

Non-voting delegates

Alaska Territory 

Alaska Territory elected its non-voting delegate August 9, 1910.

Arizona Territory 

Arizona Territory elected its non-voting delegate sometime in 1910, but did not serve out the complete term as statehood was granted in 1912.

New Mexico Territory 

New Mexico Territory elected its non-voting delegate sometime in 1910, but did not serve out the complete term as statehood was granted in 1912.

See also
 1910 United States elections
 1910–11 United States Senate elections
 61st United States Congress
 62nd United States Congress

Notes

References

Bibliography
 Baker, John D. “The Character of the Congressional Revolution of 1910.” Journal of American History 60#3 (1973), pp. 679–691. online on the revolt against Cannon
 Coletta, Paolo E. The Presidency of William Howard Taft (1973) pp 101–120.
 
 Gould, Lewis L. The William Howard Taft Presidency (2009) pp 107–120.
 Hechler, Ken. Insurgency; personalities and politics of the Taft era (1964) online
 
 
 Rubin, Ruth Bloch. "Organizing for Insurgency: Intraparty Organization and the Development of the House Insurgency, 1908–1910." Studies in American Political Development 27.2 (2013): 86-110 online.
 Solvick, Stanley D. "William Howard Taft and the Payne-Aldrich Tariff." Mississippi Valley Historical Review 50.3 (1963): 424-442 online.

External links
 
 
 Office of the Historian (Office of Art & Archives, Office of the Clerk, U.S. House of Representatives)